Yuri Ivanovich Moiseev (July 15, 1940 in Penza, Soviet Union – September 25, 2005) was an ice hockey player who played in the Soviet Hockey League.  He played for HC CSKA Moscow.

He won a gold medal at the 1968 Winter Olympics, and at the 1968 World Championships.  He was inducted into the Russian and Soviet Hockey Hall of Fame in 1968.

References

External links
 
 Russian and Soviet Hockey Hall of Fame bio

1940 births
2005 deaths
Burials in Troyekurovskoye Cemetery
HC CSKA Moscow players
Ice hockey players at the 1968 Winter Olympics
Medalists at the 1968 Winter Olympics
Metallurg Novokuznetsk players
Olympic gold medalists for the Soviet Union
Olympic ice hockey players of the Soviet Union
Olympic medalists in ice hockey
Soviet ice hockey left wingers
Sportspeople from Penza